These are the official results of the Men's 3.000 metres Steeplechase event at the 1993 IAAF World Championships in Stuttgart, Germany. There were a total number of 34 participating athletes, with three qualifying heats and the final held on Saturday 1993-08-21.

Final

Qualifying heats
Held on Thursday 1993-08-19

See also
 1990 Men's European Championships 3.000m Steeplechase (Split)
 1991 Men's World Championships 3.000m Steeplechase (Tokyo)
 1992 Men's Olympic 3.000m Steeplechase (Barcelona)
 1994 Men's European Championships 3.000m Steeplechase (Helsinki)
 1995 Men's World Championships 3.000m Steeplechase (Gothenburg)

References
 Results
 Results-World Athletics

S
Steeplechase at the World Athletics Championships